Aaron Hillegass (born 1969) Is the founder and former CEO of Big Nerd Ranch. Aaron is best known to many programmers as the author of Objective-C: The Big Nerd Ranch Guide, Cocoa Programming for Mac OS X, and iOS Programming: The Big Nerd Ranch Guide.

Between 1995 and 1997, he was employed at NeXT as a developer and trainer. In 1997, NeXT merged with Apple Computer. Hillegass elected to leave his role to start his own dot-com business. In 2000, he was then contracted by Apple to help train their software developers in the Cocoa application programming interface (API), an evolution of the NEXTSTEP API.  This led to the creation of Big Nerd Ranch, a professional services company that originally worked only with Apple technologies. Today, Big Nerd Ranch provides product development, and developer training, for a range of app development projects, including iOS, Android, frontend and backend, Cocoa and user experience/user interface design.

In 2012, he merged Big Nerd Ranch with Highgroove Studios and demoted himself to Chief Learning Officer. In December 2014, he resumed his role as CEO. 

He retired from Big Nerd Ranch in August 2017 and received his Masters in Computational Science and Engineering at Georgia Tech in 2021.  He sold his interest in Big Nerd Ranch to projekt202, a subsidiary of Amdocs, in June 2020.

Aaron is currently the Director of Applied Data Science at New College of Florida in Sarasota, Florida.  He is the executive director of the Kontinua Foundationwhich is developing free STEM education materials for high school students.

Aaron Hillegass is also an investor. In 2014, Forbes Magazine named him one of the top 10 amateur stock pickers in America after his portfolio on Marketocracy earned an average annual return of 16.2% over ten years.  He was the original angel investor in Greenlight Financial Technology, Inc.

Bibliography
Christian Keur; Aaron Hillegass; Joe Conway (2014). iOS Programming: The Big Nerd Ranch Guide. Big Nerd Ranch. 4th Edition (February 2014). .
Aaron Hillegass and Mikey Ward (2013). Objective-C Programming: The Big Nerd Ranch Guide. Big Nerd Ranch. 2nd Edition (November 2013). .
Aaron Hillegass and Adam Preble (2011). Cocoa Programming for Mac OS X. Addison-Wesley. 4th Edition (November 2011). .
Mark Dalrymple; Aaron Hillegass (2005). Advanced Mac OS X Programming. (Sept 2005). .

References

External links
 Bio at Big Nerd Ranch
Working at Big Nerd Ranch: An Interview with Aaron Hillegass
Apple Lab/Mac4ever WWDC interview with Aaron Hillegass
TUAW at Big Nerd Ranch
Interview with Aaron Hillegass by Scott Stevenson

1969 births
American male writers
Living people